Akalmand is a Hindi language romantic comedy Indian movie directed by N.S. Raj Bharath. The film stars Jeetendra, Sridevi, Ashok Kumar, Kader Khan and Shakti Kapoor in lead roles with Aruna Irani, Sarika and Raza Murad in supportive roles.

Plot 
The film begins with the foremost surgeon Dr. Kiran who embarked to operate on a notorious criminal in which he succeeds irrespective of threats. Just after, Inspector Prabhu presents him with a coin that has a lucky charm as gratitude. Besides, Kiran is annoyed with his wife's possessive and suspicious Priya. Once, in her absence, his friend Shakti introduces him to a dancer Lulu that lures him. Meanwhile, Lulu identifies Shakti as a kingpin, so, she extorts him. Hence, Shakti decides to eliminate her. At the same time, Kiran calls her for a night but upon her arrival, he is unable to deceive his wife whereby, whereas Lulu respects his morality. 

During talks, Kiran learns that she is striving hard for the treatment of her blind sister and dumb brother. So, commiserated Kiran gifts the lucky charm coin to Lulu and asks her to stay for the night due to the heavy rain. Exploiting it, Shakti brutally kills Lulu when Kiran becomes panic-stricken spotting her dead body but crossing many hurdles, he disposes of it. By the time, Priya returns and Kiran pretends to be normal but he is clutched into a vicious circle day by day. Then, his well-wisher Major Uncle boasts about his courage and guidance to catch the real homicide. So, Kiran starts his investigation moves pawns and proves Shakti guilty. Finally, the movie ends with Kiran pleading for forgiveness from Priya and shouldering Lulu‘s brother & sister.

Cast 

 Jeetendra as Dr. Kiran
 Sridevi as Priya
 Ashok Kumar as Major
 Sarika as Advocate Shobha
 Aruna Irani as Lulu
 Kader Khan as Z
 Shakti Kapoor as Shakti
 Raza Murad as Police Inspector
 Birbal as drunk

Soundtrack 
The lyrics are written by Anand Bakshi

Trivia 
Jeetendra's two films Maqsad and Akalmand released on same day.

See also 
 Jeetendra
 Sridevi
 Jeetendra filmography

References 

Indian romantic comedy films
1980s Hindi-language films